The Ministry of Interior Affairs is the cabinet ministry of Afghanistan responsible for law enforcement, civil order and fighting crime. The ministry's headquarters is located in Kabul.

The current minister of Interior Affairs is Sirajuddin Haqqani, who is also the first deputy leader of Afghanistan and the leader of the Haqqani network.

List of ministers

The first Islamic Emirate period
During the Islamic Emirate of Afghanistan (1996–2001), Abdul Samad Khaksar (also referred to as Mohammad Khaksar in some news reports) was a Taliban deputy Minister of the Interior, who is notable because he offered to help the US deal with al-Qaeda and became an informant for the Northern Alliance. Khaksar was assassinated on January 14, 2006 by Taliban gunmen.

Joint Task Force Guantanamo counterterrorism analysts described Khairullah Khairkhwa as a former Taliban Minister of the Interior.
However, during his second annual Administrative Review Board hearing Khairullah Khairkhwa disputed this allegation.

The Islamic Republic period

During the Islamic Republic of Afghanistan (2004–2021), the ministry maintained the Afghan National Police, the General Command of Police Special Units and the General Directorate of Prisons and Detention Centers (GDPDC).

Police forces
 Afghan National Police (ANP)
 Afghan Uniformed Police (AUP)
 Public Security Police (PSP)
 Afghan Border Force (ABP)
 General Directorate for Intelligence and Counter Crime (GDICC) (formerly Afghan Anti-Crime Police (AACP))
 Afghan Public Protection Force (APPF)
 Counter Narcotics Police of Afghanistan (CNPA)
 Afghan Local Police (ALP)
 General Command of Police Special Units (GCPSU)
 Afghan Territorial Force (ATF) 444
 Crisis Response Unit (CRU) 222
 Afghan Special Narcotics Force - also known as Force 333 or Commando Force 333. The force was a counternarcotics paramilitary unit, founded at the end of 2003 with training and assistance from British advisers. It carried out drug interdiction missions in remote areas of the country against high-value targets such as drug laboratories. The Department of Defense provided the unit with intelligence and airlift support. All of its operations were sanctioned by the President and Minister of Interior Affairs. It operated regularly with the U.S. Drug Enforcement Administration on raids and seized hundreds of tonnes of illicit drugs. 
 Provincial Special Units

Notes

See also
 Ministry of Defense (Afghanistan)

References

External links
 Official site
 
 Official site of the Afghan Public Protection Force

Ministries of the Islamic Republic of Afghanistan
Government ministries of Afghanistan
Afghanistan